Nodicostellaria kaicherae is a species of sea snail, a marine gastropod mollusk, in the family Costellariidae, the ribbed miters.

Description
The only reported location of Nodicostellaria kaicherae is in the Atlantic Ocean just east of the Caribbean Sea and off the north-east coast of Venezuela.

References

External links
 Petuch, E. J. (1979). New gastropods from the Abrolhos Archipelago and reef complex, Brazil. Proceedings of the Biological Society of Washington 92(3):510-526. 4: figs

Costellariidae